Sosnówka  is a village in the administrative district of Gmina Kłoczew, within Ryki County, Lublin Voivodeship, in eastern Poland.

In 2005 the village had a population of 140.

References

Villages in Ryki County